During the 1992–93 English football season, Middlesbrough competed in the inaugural season of the Premier League. It was Middlesbrough's first season in the top flight since relegation in 1988; Middlesbrough regained promotion to England's top flight by finishing second in the old Second Division (renamed the First Division after the foundation of the Premier League).

Season summary
Middlesbrough enjoyed a good start to the season, winning four of their first seven games – including a superb 4–1 home win over Yorkshire rivals and reigning champions Leeds United – a run that sent them sixth in the table. Unfortunately, they couldn't quite keep up the momentum but still, up to their thrilling 3–2 victory over Blackburn Rovers on 5 December 1992, they enjoyed stable mid-table form, winning six, drawing six and losing six of their first 18 games. Unfortunately, three consecutive draws followed and from then, starting from a 1–0 home defeat to strugglers Crystal Palace before the new year, the club struggled and went into freefall during the entire second half of the season, winning just three of their next 18 fixtures and picking up just ten points from a possible 54, a run that ultimately resulted in the club's relegation looking inevitable with three matches left.

However, a 3–0 win over Tottenham Hotspur gave them a very slim glimmer of hope for an unlikely survival; on the other hand, they would never look like pulling off the 'great escape' that relegation rivals Oldham Athletic would soon perfect. With just two matches left, they were already three points adrift of Sheffield United and five adrift of Crystal Palace, both having a game in hand. Despite a 3–2 win at Sheffield Wednesday, results went against them: Palace beating Ipswich Town 3–1, Sheffield United condemning Nottingham Forest to relegation by winning 2–0 at the City Ground and Oldham stunning title chasers Aston Villa 1–0 at Villa Park which also saw Manchester United clinching their first top-flight title for 26 years. With these results, Middlesbrough were left with a virtually impossible survival task, with only one game left and were three points adrift of Sheffield United who had two games left with a vastly superior goal difference of −3 against Boro's −21. They needed the Blades to lose both of their final games with a miracle 18-goal swing and to beat third-placed Norwich City in their final game for any chance of survival. Sadly, Boro's relegation was confirmed before a ball was kicked on their closing fixture as the Blades beat Everton 2–0 at Goodison Park. A 3–3 draw with Norwich City for Boro at least meant that they finished a difficult season on a high note in the final three games, going down fighting, and it gave them a glimpse of positivity in gaining promotion back to the Premier League at the first attempt for next season. They finished in 21st place, five points adrift of safety.

Kit
Middlesbrough's kit was manufactured by Admiral. The shirt sponsor was Imperial Chemical Industries.

Final league table

Results

Premier League

FA Cup

Coca Cola Cup

First-team squad

References

Middlesbrough F.C. seasons
Middlesbrough